Rosa willmottiae, Miss Willmott's rose or Willmott's rose, is a species in the genus Rosa in the plant family Rosaceae. The branches are covered in many straight prickles. The pinnate leaves typically have 7 to 9 small bluish-green leaflets which emit a pleasant fragrance when bruised. It was introduced to western cultivation by Ernest Wilson in 1904 and was named after the collector and horticulturist Ellen Willmott. The flowers are small, lilac-pink, and are borne on short laterals all along the length of the branches in late spring/early summer. The hips are small, becoming orange-red and losing their tips when ripe.

Charles & Bridget Quest-Ritson describe Rosa willmottiae as "one of the few wild roses that merits a place in a mixed border or even as a specimen shrub" and that when in flower it is "the embodiment of beauty".

References

wilmottiae
Flora of Asia
Plants described in 1907